Brian Feeney (born 1970) is an Irish former hurler who played as a centre-back for the Galway senior team. 

An All-Ireland-winning captain in the under-21 grade, Feeney made his first appearance for the senior team during the 1991-92 National League and became a regular member of the team over much of the next decade. During that time he won one National Hurling League winners' medal.

At club level Feeney is a three-time All-Ireland medalist with Athenry. In addition to this he has also won eightConnacht medals and eight county club championship medals.

References

1970 births
Living people
Athenry hurlers
Galway inter-county hurlers
Connacht inter-provincial hurlers